Canada (House of Commons) v Vaid, [2005] 1 S.C.R. 667, 2005 SCC 30 is the leading decision of the Supreme Court of Canada on parliamentary privilege.  The court developed a test for determining when a claim of parliamentary privilege can protect a legislative body or its members from legal scrutiny.  Besides the parties to the case (the House of Commons of Canada, Member of Parliament Gilbert Parent, Satnam Vaid, and the Canadian Human Rights Commission), the court heard from the following interveners: the Attorney General of Canada, Senator Serge Joyal, Senator Mobina Jaffer, the Canadian Association of Professional Employees, the Communications, Energy and Paperworkers Union of Canada, and the Speaker of the Legislative Assembly of Ontario.

Background
Satnam Vaid was a chauffeur for the various Speakers of the House of Commons from 1984 to 1994. On January 11, 1995, Vaid was dismissed because he allegedly refused to accept the new duties under a revised job description.

Vaid filed a grievance for his termination, and on July 25, 1995, the Board of Adjudication ruled in Vaid's favour and ordered that he be allowed to resume his employment as chauffeur. During the adjudication, Vaid claimed racial discrimination, which the board said was not made out.

On August 17, 1995, Vaid returned to work, at which time he was told that the chauffeur's position had been changed to a bilingual one, and Vaid was sent for French language training.

On April 8, 1997, Vaid requested that he be allowed to return to work. On May 12, 1997, the Speaker's office, under then Speaker, Gilbert Parent, replied that due to reorganization, Vaid's position was being made surplus effective May 29, 1997.

Judicial history
On July 10, 1997, Vaid complained to the Canadian Human Rights Commission, claiming that the Speaker and the House of Commons discriminated against him due to race, colour, and national or ethnic origin.  Vaid also claimed workplace harassment.

The complaints were referred to the Canadian Human Rights Tribunal.  Parent and the House of Commons challenged the Tribunal's jurisdiction to hear the complaint due to parliamentary privilege.

Parent and the House of Commons sought judicial review at the Federal Court, Trial Division, which was refused.  This decision was upheld by the Federal Court of Appeal.

Reasons of the court
A unanimous decision of the court was written by Justice Ian Binnie.

The court found that the first step of determining whether parliamentary privilege exists at the federal level in a particular area is to ascertain whether the existence and scope of the claimed privilege have been authoritatively established in relation the Parliament of Canada or to the House of Commons at Westminster.

If the existence and scope of the claimed privilege has not been authoritatively established, then it must be tested against the doctrine of necessity. That is, the assembly or member seeking its immunity must show that the sphere of activity for which privilege is claimed is so closely and directly connected with the fulfillment by the assembly or its members of their functions as a legislative and deliberative body, including the assembly's work in holding the government to account, that outside interference would undermine the level of autonomy required to enable the assembly and its members to do their work with dignity and efficiency.

The court went on to find that parliamentary privilege was not so broad as to protect employment matters. Justice Binnie wrote:

However, unrelated to the parliamentary privilege issue, the court found that the Canadian Human Rights Act did not apply to parliamentary employees, as their labour issues were under the exclusive jurisdiction of the Parliamentary Employment and Staff Relations Act. Therefore, the Canadian Human Rights Tribunal did not have jurisdiction on the matter, and the appeal was allowed.

See also
 List of Supreme Court of Canada cases (McLachlin Court)

External links
 
 Federal Court of Appeal decision
 Federal Court decision
 Canadian Human Rights Tribunal Decision

Supreme Court of Canada cases
Canadian constitutional case law
Canadian labour case law
House of Commons of Canada
Parliamentary procedure in Canada
2005 in Canadian case law